Croatian Americans or Croat Americans are Americans who have full or partial Croatian ancestry. In 2012, there were 414,714 American citizens of Croat or Croatian descent living in the United States as per revised 2010 United States Census. The figure includes all people affiliated with United States who claim Croatian ancestry, both those born in the country and naturalized citizens, as well as those with dual citizenship who affiliate themselves with both countries or cultures.

Croatian Americans identify with other European American ethnic groups, especially Slavic Americans and are predominantly of Roman Catholic faith. Regions with significant Croatian American population include  metropolitan areas of Chicago, Cleveland, New York City, Southern California and especially Pittsburgh, the seat of Croatian Fraternal Union, fraternal benefit society of the Croatian diaspora. Croatia's State Office for the Croats Abroad estimated that there are up to 1.2 million Croats and their descendants living in the United States.

Demographics

Numbers
According to the 2007 U.S. Community Survey, there were 420,763 Americans of full or partial Croatian descent. According to the 1990 United States Census, there were over 544,270 Croatian Americans who identified themselves as being of Croatian descent or being born in Croatia. As of 2012, there were 414,714 American citizens. It is estimated by the Croatia's State Office for the Croats Abroad that there are around 1,200,000 Croats and their descendants living in the United States today.

In the 2006–2010 American Community Survey, the states with the largest Croatian American populations are:

 Pennsylvania (50,995)
 California (45,537)
 Illinois (44,065)
 Ohio (41,430)
 New York (26,607)
 Michigan (20,547)
 Florida (16,360)
 Wisconsin (15,775)
 Indiana (13,306)
 Washington (13,268)
 New Jersey (13,154)

History
1880 estimate: 20,000
1980 census: 252,970
1990 census: 544,270
2000 census: 374,241
2005 community survey: 401,208

Croatian-born population
Croatian-born population in the U.S. since 2010:

History 

The first major immigration of Croats was recorded in 1715. At the time, approximately twelve hundred Croatian Protestants, whose ancestors had left the Austrian Empire after unsuccessful peasant revolts in 1573 and anti-Reformation edict of 1598, arrived in the American colony of Georgia. They settled in the valley of Savannah River. Those settlers introduced silk-worm cultivation in Georgia. The community prospered for 150 years, until it was demolished during the Civil War.

In 1683, a Croat Jesuit, named Ivan Ratkaj (Juan Ratkay) established a mission in northwest New Spain. In 1746, another Jesuit, Ferdinand Konšak (Consago Gonzales), drew the first dependable map of Baja California. Beginning in 1783, Joseph Kundek, a Croat missionary, helped to develop several midwestern towns, including Ferdinand and Jasper, both in Dubois County, Indiana. In the 1830s, various groups in the Austrian Empire sent financial aid to America to support missionary activities.

Many early Croat immigrants settled in New Orleans, and were employed as traders, artisans and fishermen. By the 1860s, there were around six hundred Croat families in New Orleans. Several families settled permanently in Alabama. During the Civil War, some three thousand Croats resided in the South, mostly in Louisiana, Alabama and Mississippi. Hundreds of them volunteered for the Confederate Army and Navy. After the defeat of the Confederacy in 1865, many Croats who had served in the Confederate military moved to the West.

Significant emigration from what is now Croatia dates from the late 1890s and early 1900s, peaking around 1910, when many Croatians, the majority of them Roman Catholics, began emigrating to the United States. Many were economic immigrants, while others considered themselves political refugees.

Like other immigrants of that period, they migrated to find employment. Many of them, mostly single young men but, often, married women with or without their families, settled in small towns in Pennsylvania and New York as coal miners or steelworkers. Many also settled in factory towns and farming areas in Midwestern states such as Wisconsin, Minnesota, Indiana, Illinois, and Iowa. For most of the single men, the stay was only temporary. Once they had saved enough money, many Croatian men returned to Croatia. However, those who did choose to stay found permanent residence.

Within a comparatively short period of time, Croatians could be found all over the United States from New York to California, from New Orleans to Minneapolis-St. Paul.  As it went through its most rapid expansion during the time of the 1890-1914 Great Migration and shortly thereafter from the onset of the First World War to the  general clampdown on immigration in 1924, Croats and other South and West Slavs and members of other groups peaking in influx at the time were prominent in the history of the mining industry in the Iron Range of Minnesota; much the same is the case with the forestry-related industries there, elsewhere in Minnesota and in much of Wisconsin.  A notable Croatian-American from the Iron Range was Rudy Perpich, the 34th and 36th Governor of the state representing the Democrat/Farmer-Labor Party; he served terms in office from December 29, 1976 to January 4, 1979, and from January 3, 1983 to January 7, 1991, spans of time which add up to make him the longest-serving governor in the state's history.  In private life, Perpich was a dentist and after leaving office in 1991 assisted the post-communist government of Croatia. He was born in Carson Lake, Minnesota (now part of Hibbing) on June 27, 1928 and died of cancer in Minnetonka, Minnesota on September 21, 1995.

A new wave of Croatian immigrants began to arrive after World War II. These were mostly political refugees, including orphans whose parents had been killed during the war, individuals and families fleeing Yugoslavia's communist authorities. Most of these Croatians settled in established Croatian colonies, often among relatives and friends. Beginning in 1965, America saw a new influx of Croatians. Gradually, this new wave of immigrants joined Croatian Catholic parishes and organizations, and soon became the contemporary bearers of Croatian culture and tradition in the United States. Currently, only a small number of Croatians continue to emigrate, mostly those who have relatives already well established in America.

Croatian immigrants also settled in Texas, Oklahoma and Missouri (esp. Kansas City and St. Louis). A Croatian community developed in Mobile, Alabama and another similar community in Pueblo, Colorado.

Settlements 

The first recorded Croatian immigrants to the United States arrived in 1850, often via the resettlement from nations that are presently known as Austria, Italy, Greece, Spain, and Portugal, and southern France. During this period many Croats, who were employed in manufacturing the maritime sector of the Mediterranean states, began emigrating to the Americas. This first wave arrived in regions of the United States where employment opportunities were similar to where they had arrived from. By the middle of the 20th Century, the metropolitan areas of Chicago, Cleveland, Pittsburgh, New York City, San Francisco Bay Area and the region of Southern California had the largest populations of people with Croatian ancestry.

Croatian immigrants first settled in the Western United States in the second half of the 19th century, mainly in what were then growing urban centers of Los Angeles, San Pedro, San Francisco, Phoenix and Santa Ana. It is estimated that more than 35,000 Croats live in Los Angeles metropolitan area today, making it the biggest Croatian community on the Pacific coast. San Francisco became the center of Croatian social life in California, where they established the first Croatian emigration society, Croatian American Cultural Center of San Francisco, in 1857. Tadich Grill in San Francisco is an example from the era,  the oldest continuously running restaurant in the city. The Los Angeles metropolitan area was a major destination for the post-1980s Yugoslavian immigration, including Croats and Bosnian Croats from Bosnia and Herzegovina who escaped the Bosnian civil war in the 1990s. They formed several communities in Orange County, San Diego and San Fernando Valley.

An unspecified number of Croats also settled in Washington state and Oregon, particularly metropolitan areas of Seattle and Portland respectively.

Some of the first groups of immigrants settled in Pennsylvania as well. As a major industrial center of the state, Pittsburgh employed a lot of immigrants from Croatia, many of them were working in the heavy industry. At the beginning of the century there were an estimated 38,000 Croats in Pittsburgh. It was estimated that there were more than 200,000 Croatians and their descendants living in Pennsylvania in the early 1990s.

The first Croatian settlers in Michigan appeared in the late 19th century. In Illinois, the Croatians started concentrating mostly around Chicago. Although it was created a bit later, the Croatian settlement in Chicago became one of the most important ones in the United States. The settlement especially started developing after World War I and Chicago became the center of all Croatian cultural and political activities. It is calculated that there were roughly 50,000 Croats in Chicago in the 1990s, while there were altogether 100,000 Croats living in 54 additional Croatian settlements in Illinois. Croats form a large community in Indianapolis in Indiana since the 1910s, as well in Gary, Fort Wayne and South Bend.

While at first New York City served merely as a station on arriving settlers' way elsewhere into the United States, mainly the Midwest, East Coast saw an influx of Croatian and other European settlers in early 19th, before and following First World War; mainly the cities of Hoboken and New York, latter of which is the site of SS. Cyril, Methodius, and Raphael's Church, a Roman Catholic parish, part of Roman Catholic Archdiocese of New York.

During the Klondike Gold Rush, a group of 3,000 Croatian immigrants settled in Alaska and Canada.

There is a Croatian community in Las Vegas.

Culture

Social association 

Croatian Americans maintain a close relationship with the region they come from. The diaspora is considered to have played a pivotal role in securing Croatia's victory in Croatian War of Independence by providing substantial financial aid and advocating for American involvement in the conflict. Chain migration contributed to the creation of settlements of Croats coming from the same regions of Croatia. They were connected because of their similar occupations that they had, equal social status and Roman Catholic religion. The most popular informal meeting points of Croatians were the saloons. They were usually engaged in various charity organizations, and were among the first Croatian immigrants who learned to speak English. Beside these informal gatherings, Croatian Americans established several thousand organizations of different importance. In his work, "Early Croatian Immigration to America After 1945", Prpic states that there were around 3,000 organizations founded between 1880 and 1940 in the United States. Croatians first started founding charitable, cultural, educational, religious, business, political, sporting or athletic organizations. All these organizations were firmly rooted in the settlement where they were initiated. Croatians were a minority group both in relation to Americans and other nationalities. Furthermore, the Croats came with the latest groups of immigrants, which led to a further feeling of insecurity. Most of early settlers did not speak English and held low-paid jobs, which created an inferiority complex. They found security within an organization of their own ethnic group.

Religion

Croatian diaspora is predominantly Roman Catholic. Croatian missionaries founded parishes, churches and benevolent societies throughout the country wherever Croatian Americans settled. Often, the priests were the only educated members of the Croatian colonies, and thus they had to assume leadership roles; moreover, they were among the first to learn English well and often served as translators and interpreters. Their primary responsibility, however, was the organization of Croatian Catholic parishes in the urban centers with substantial Croatian populations. Thus, at the beginning of this century there were Croatian churches in Pittsburgh and Steelton, Pennsylvania, New York, Chicago, Cleveland, Saint Louis and other cities. The oldest parish is St. Nicholas Church in Pittsburgh, founded in 1894; several others were erected in the early 1900s, such as the Church of the Nativity in San Francisco. Even before being officially established in 1926, the Croatian Franciscan friars traveled throughout the United States, establishing and assisting in Croatian parishes and keeping alive the religious and national sentiments of their people. Today, there are over 30 Croatian parishes in North America.

Organizations
 The Croatian American organization Croatian Fraternal Union is a society with long roots in the country.  It was founded in 1897.  During World War II, the organization provided financial aid for Croatia. The CFU contributes to Croatian Americans by scholarships and cultural learning.
 The National Federation of Croatian Americans Cultural Foundation was founded in 1993 as a non-profit organization dedicated to promoting the interest of the Croatian people - embodying heritage of culture and language, integrity in human rights and equality in self-determination, advancing economic development, and freedom from persecution.
 The Croatian American Association is a group which lobbies the United States Congress on issues related to Croatia.
 In 2007, the annual Croatian Film Festival in New York was founded by The Doors Art Foundation.
 In the October of 2022, National Federation of Croatian Americans Cultural Foundation held inaugural induction of laureates in the Croatian-American Sports Hall of Fame in Cleveland: Helen Crlenkovich, Fred Couples, John Havlicek, Mickey Lolich, Roger Maris, Kevin McHale, George Mikan, Mark Pavelich, Joe Sakic and Joe Stydahar.

Notable people 
  
Notable Croatian Americans, past and present, include:

Art 

 Mirko Ilić, graphic designer and comics artist
 Ivan Meštrović, sculptor and Professor at Syracuse and Notre Dame
 Vinko Nikolić, writer, poet and journalist
 Maksimilijan Vanka, painter
 Matthew Yuricich,  Academy Award nominated special effects artist

Film 

 Anna Chlumsky, actress
 Jenna Elfman, actress
 Josip Elic, actor
 Judah Friedlander, actor and comedian
 Mira Furlan, actress
 Gloria Grey, actress
 Bobby Grubic, film and commercial director / producer
 Thomas Horn, actor. His mother is Croatian born.
 Anne Jackson, actress
 Lou Lumenick, film critic
 Branko Lustig, film producer, Academy Award winner
 John Malkovich, actor
 Joe Manganiello, actor
 Ivana Miličević, actress
 John Miljan, actor
 Sergio Mimica-Gezzan, television director
 Daniella Monet, actress
 Patrick Muldoon, actor
 Frank Pavich, director
 George Payne, pornographic film actor
 Rick Rossovich, actor
 Izabela Vidovic, actress
 Goran Višnjić, actor
 Dianne Wiest, actress
 Louis Zorich, actor
 Jim Zulevic, actor and comedian

Music 

 "Weird Al" Yankovic - singer, musician, songwriter, record producer, actor, and author.
 Thana Alexa - jazz vocalist, composer, arranger, and producer.
 Zlatko Baloković, violinist
 Annie Bosko, Croatian American, singer and country music star
 Tony Butala, lead singer of vocal group, The Lettermen
 Michael Kastelic - singer in Honeyburst, The Cynics. Founder of Pittsburgh-based rock & roll record label Get Hip Recordings.
 Gregg Kostelich - guitarist in The Cynics. Founder of Pittsburgh-based rock & roll record label Get Hip Recordings.
 Clair Marlo (born Clara Veseliza), singer, songwriter, composer, and record producer 
 Sanya Mateyas Croatian born (as Sanja Matejaš) singer, lead singer for Los Angeles-based hard-rock band Duda Did It
 Tatjana Matejaš Cameron, singer
 Miljenko Matijević, singer and songwriter; the lead vocalist of rock band Steelheart
 Johnny Mercer, four-time Academy Award winner
 Helen Merrill (born Jelena Milcetic), jazz singer 
 Zinka Milanov, operatic spinto soprano
 Tomo Miličević, musician and lead guitarist of the alternative rock band Thirty Seconds to Mars
 Guy Mitchell, pop singer
 Krist Novoselić, bassist of Nirvana
 Marty Paich, pianist, composer, arranger, record producer, music director, and conductor.
 David Paich, keyboardist for the rock band Toto, composer, arranger, producer
 Mia Slavenska, prima ballerina
 Louis Svećenski, violinist and rector of the Boston Academy of Music
 Paul Salamunovich, renowned choral conductor of the Los Angeles Master Chorale
 Frank Secich, rock musician, songwriter, author, record producer (Blue Ash, Stiv Bators, Club Wow)
 Johnny Vidacovich, jazz drummer. Father's side Croatian, mother's side Sicilian.
 David J. Vucenich (1966 - 2017) - bass player in The Cynics, The Mount McKinleys, Uncle Sydney.

Science 

 Milislav Demerec, geneticist
 Terry Jonathan Hart, former astronaut
 Jacob Matijevic,  NASA engineer
 Paul L. Modrich, biochemist, Nobel Prize in Chemistry (2015)
 Mario Puratić,  inventor of Puretic power block
 Bogdan Raditsa, historian
 George M. Skurla, aeronautical engineer for the Apollo Program
 Henry Suzzallo, president of the University of Washington
 Dinko Tomašić, sociologist

Politics 
 Michael D. Antonovich, Republican politician in California
 Mark Begich,  Democratic Senator from Alaska
 Nick Begich,  Democratic Representative from Alaska
 Michael Anthony Bilandic, Democratic Mayor of Chicago
 Frank Ivancie, Democratic Mayor of Portland, Oregon
 Dennis Kucinich, Democratic Representative from Ohio
 John Kasich, Republican Governor of Ohio
 Rose Mofford, Democratic Governor of Arizona
 Rudy Perpich, Democratic Governor of Minnesota
 George Radanovich, Republican Representative from California
 Michael Stepovich, Republican Governor of Alaska Territory
 Pete Visclosky, Democratic Representative from Indiana

Entrepreneurs 
 Tony Robbins, coach
 Mike Grgich, winemaker
Eoghan Joyce (Poduje), CEO of Servant Air Alaska and President of Star Air Group .
 Jay Kordich (1923-2017), The "father of juicing" and the inventor of the Juiceman Juicer. Both his parents were Croatian immigrants from the island of Vis.
 Anthony Francis Lucas, oil industry pioneer
 Anthony Maglica, entrepreneur and inventor of Maglite flashlights
 Mario Puratic, entrepreneur and inventor of Puretic power block
 Frank Vlasic, founder and namesake of Vlasic Pickles

Sports 

 Bill Belichick, professional football coach
 Pete Carroll, professional football coach
 Jason Chorak, college football player
 Krešimir Ćosić, professional basketball player
 Duje Dukan, professional basketball player, born in Croatia
 David Diehl, professional football player, Croatian on mother's side
 Greg Dulcich, professional football player, full Croatian on father and mother's sides
 Elvis Grbac, professional football player
 Toni Kukoč, professional basketball player
 John Jurkovic, professional football player
 Mickey Lolich, professional  baseball player
 Roger Maris, professional  baseball player
 John Mayasich, hockey player
 Kevin McHale and John Havlicek, NBA hall of fame members, both share Croatian ancestry on their mothers' sides (Starcevic and Turkalj being their mothers' respective maiden names)
 Pat Miletich, UFC Hall of Famer
 Stipe Miocic, UFC World Heavyweight Champion
 George Mikan, professional basketball player
 Mark Pavelich, professional hockey player
 Mike Pecarovich - American college football coach, lawyer, and actor.
 Johnny Pesky, professional baseball player and announcer
 Christian Pulisic, professional soccer player
 Tony Prpic, professional hockey player
 Gene Rayburn, game show host
 Lou Saban, football coach
 Nick Saban, professional football coach
 Rudy Tomjanovich, professional basketball player and coach
 Danny Vranes (Vranješ), professional basketball player (NBA)
 Fritzie Zivic, boxer, held the world welterweight championship

Religion 
 Blase Joseph Cupich, American catholic cardinal
 Ivan Dragićević, Catholic visionary
 Ferdinand Konščak, Croatian missionary to North America
 John E. Kozar, Roman Catholic priest and President of the Catholic Near East Welfare Association
 Joseph Kundek, a Croatian missionary
 Ivan Ratkaj, a Croatian missionary

Other 
 Mike Cernovich, social media personality and political commentator. Both his His paternal great grandparents were Croatian immigrants.
 Norman Cota, United States Army general
 Louis Cukela, United States Marine, two-time Medal of Honor recipient
 Jakša Cvitanić, mathematician
 John Owen Dominis, Prince Consort of Hawaii
 William Feller, mathematician
 Gary Gabelich,  race car driver.
 Anthony Jeselnik, comedian. His maternal grandfather was Michael Nicholas "Mike" Bakarich, the son of Steven Bakarich who was the son of Croatian immigrants Nick Bakarich and Catherine Popic.
 Kathy Keller, Christian writer
 Ron Kovic, anti-war activist
 Brian Krzanich, ex-CEO of Intel
Peter Miscovich (born Pero Mišković, 1885–1950), founder of the world's longest-operating family-owned gold mine still in operation.
 Steve Nelson (activist), labor activist and organizer, political Commissar in the Abraham Lincoln Brigade, and National Commander of the Veterans of the Abraham Lincoln Brigade (VALB)
 Bill Rancic, entrepreneur, reality TV star, winner of the first season of The Apprentice
 John J. Tominac, Medal of Honor recipient
 Peter Tomich, Medal of Honor recipient, United States Navy sailor

See also 
 Croats
 List of Croats
 Croatia–United States relations

Notes and references 

Citations

Bibliography

Further reading 

 
 
 
 
 
 Ifković, Edward. "Croatian Americans." in Gale Encyclopedia of Multicultural America, edited by Thomas Riggs, (3rd ed., vol. 1, Gale, 2014), pp. 577–589. Online

External links 
Croatia and Croatians, Books about Croats in America
Bibliography about Croatian Americans, Papers about Croats in America

 

 
American
European-American society